The International Alliance of Catholic Knights (IACK) is a non-governmental organization made up of fifteen Roman Catholic fraternal orders from 27 countries on six continents.  The IACK was founded in Glasgow on 12 October 1979 at a meeting of the leaders of six fraternal societies, convened on the occasion of the Diamond Jubilee of the Knights of Saint Columba. The organization is headquartered in Dublin, Ireland.

The IACK is currently an associate member of the Conference of International Catholic Organizations.  The CICO is made up of 36 member organizations, four associated organizations and four invited organizations.  These international organizations of more than 150 million lay people, through their respective national branches, are present in more than 150 countries.

Member organizations

Mission statement

During the constitutional meeting, it was resolved that these Fraternal Orders would found an International Alliance for the purpose of working together for the mutual advantage of the individual Member Orders and the extension of Catholic Knighthood throughout the world.  Furthermore, the IACK holds its members to:
 Bring the message of Christ to all people.
 Give loyalty and support in every way possible to our Holy Father The Pope and all Bishops, Priests and Religious throughout the world.
 Use their individual and joint influence to eliminate injustice from society.
 Cooperate with other Catholic international organizations and the Pontifical Council for the Laity to advance the Christian way of life.
 Extend the vision of The Blessed Reverend Father Michael J. McGivney (founder of the Knights of Columbus) by assisting each Member Order to progress and grow and by promoting the establishment of new Orders of Catholic Knights.
 Strengthen the individual and distinct Member Orders by corporate action and to strive to deepen the faith of members of the Alliance and all Catholics in general by encouraging their active and generous participation in the Life and Mission of the Church.
 Pursue these aims by uniting all throughout the world in prayer.

The IACK was approved as a Catholic international organization by the Holy See in 1981. By a decree dated 14 April 1992 the International Alliance of Catholic Knights was given official recognition by the Vatican as an International Catholic Association of the Faithful, in accordance with Canons 298–311 and 321–329 of the Code of Canon Law.

Leadership
It was agreed that the Supreme Knight or National President of each Member Order would form an International Council which would meet annually (now biennially) and be responsible for the organization and development of the new Alliance and would provide a forum in which the leaders of the Orders could discuss matters of common concern. The Leaders present at this historic gathering are recognized as the Founders of the International Alliance of Catholic Knights.

References

External links
International Alliance of Catholic Knights

 
Organizations established in 1979
Religious organisations based in Ireland